A parson is an Anglican parish priest.

Parson may also refer to:

People with the given name or nickname
Parson James (born 1994), American singer and songwriter
Parson Nicholson (1863–1917), American baseball player
Parson Perryman (1888–1966), American baseball player

People with the surname
Alison Parson (born c. 1984), American country singer and songwriter
Annie-B Parson, American choreographer and dancer
Chris Parson, American voice actor
Del Parson (born 1948), American painter
Elizabeth Parson (1812–1873), British hymn writer
Henry George Parson (1865–1936), English-Canadian merchant and politician
Hubert T. Parson (1872–1940), American businessman
Mike Parson (born 1955), American politician and governor of Missouri since 2018
Rynell Parson (born 1990), American sprinter

Other uses
Parson, British Columbia, an unincorporated community
Parson's Pleasure, a place for nude bathing in Oxford, and a short story by Roald Dahl
Parsons table, a modernist straight-edged table
Parson Russell Terrier, a breed of dog

See also
Parsons (disambiguation)

English-language surnames